San Ramón is a canton in the Alajuela province of Costa Rica. The head city is in San Ramón district.

History 
San Ramón was created on 21 August 1856 by decree 17.

Geography 
San Ramón has an area of  km² and a mean elevation of  metres.

An oddly-shaped canton, San Ramon stretches north through the eastern heights of the Cordillera de Tilarán, looking down on the Central Valley (Valle Central) to its east. The canton forms the border with the province of Guanacaste to the west.

Districts 
The canton of San Ramón is subdivided into the following districts:
 San Ramón
 Santiago
 San Juan
 Piedades Norte
 Piedades Sur
 San Rafael
 San Isidro
 Los Ángeles
 Alfaro
 Volio
 Concepción
 Zapotal
 Peñas Blancas
 San Lorenzo

Demographics 

For the 2011 census, San Ramón had a population of  inhabitants.

Transportation

Road transportation 
The canton is covered by the following road routes:

References 

Cantons of Alajuela Province
Populated places in Alajuela Province